Fire and Filigree is a studio album by American jazz trombonist Curtis Fuller which was released on December 6, 1978 via Bee Hive Records label.

Reception

Scott Yanow of Allmusic awarded the album four stars out of five, stating "For this excellent hard bop date, trombonist Curtis Fuller and the powerful tenor Sal Nistico make for a potent front line. With pianist Walter Bishop Jr., bassist Sam Jones and drummer Freddie Waits keeping the momentum flowing, the quintet performs two Fuller originals, Kenny Dorham's "Minor's Holiday," and three standards. Although the bop-oriented BeeHive label has since become inactive, one might be able to find this swinging and enjoyable album, one of Curtis Fuller's best sets of the era."

Track listing

Personnel
Bass – Sam Jones
Drums – Freddie Waits
Piano – Walter Bishop, Jr.
Tenor saxophone – Sal Nistico
Trombone – Curtis Fuller

References

External links
Curtis Fuller's Discography

Curtis Fuller albums
1978 albums
Bee Hive Records albums